Antoine-Léonce Michaux (born November 6, 1822 in Basse-Terre, Guadeloupe, and died January 20, 1893, France) was Governor General for French India in the Second French Colonial Empire under the French Third Republic.

Life
Antoine-Léonce Michaux join the French Navy in 1841, Clerk the Navy in 1845, Help Commissioner in 1848 and Deputy Commissioner in 1855. He's Authorising Officer in 1860, in residence at Guadeloupe, with Napoleon Bontemps. He became the Assistant Commissioner in 1861. He was promoted Chevalier of the légion d'honneur on December 31, 1863. He was promoted to Commissioner General of the Navy in 1866. He's in 1869, in residence at New Caledonia, Authorising Officer, with the Rear Admiral Charles Guillain. He was elevated to Officer of the Légion d'honneur in 1872. From 1876 to 1877, he was Head for the protectorate over the Kingdom of Tahiti. He's then paymaster general in Martinique around 1879. He was briefly Governor General for French India in 1871 (June–November).

References

Titles held

1822 births
1893 deaths
People from Basse-Terre
French colonial governors and administrators
Governors of French India
People of the French Third Republic